Elections to Amber Valley Borough Council were held on 1 May 2003.  One third of the council was up for election and the Conservative Party held overall control of the council.

After the election, the composition of the council was:
Conservative 25
Labour 20

Election result

Ward results

External links
BBC report of 2003 Amber Valley election result

2003 English local elections
2003
2000s in Derbyshire